Aminobacterium colombiense is a Gram-negative, mesophilic, strictly anaerobic and non-spore-forming  bacterium from the genus of Aminobacterium which has been isolated from anaerobic lagoon from a dairy wastewater treatment plant in Colombia.

Further Information 

 Complete genome sequence of Aminobacterium colombiense type strain (ALA-1T)
 Proteomes - Aminobacterium colombiense (strain DSM 12261 / ALA-1)

References

Bacteria described in 1999
Synergistota